The 1947 New York Yankees season was the team's 45th season. The team finished with a record of 97–57, winning their 15th pennant, finishing 12 games ahead of the Detroit Tigers. New York was managed by Bucky Harris. The Yankees played their home games at Yankee Stadium. In the World Series, they defeated the Brooklyn Dodgers in 7 games. It was the first ever season of the Yankees to be broadcast live on television with WABD providing the television broadcast feed to viewers in the city.

Regular season
The 1947 Yankees, led by MVP Joe DiMaggio, won the AL pennant by 12 games over the Tigers. They played the Brooklyn Dodgers in the World Series, winning a close-fought seven-game series that featured memorable moments like Cookie Lavagetto's walk-off double in game 4 and Al Gionfriddo's famous catch that robbed DiMaggio of a potential home run.

Season standings

Record vs. opponents

Roster

Player stats

Batting

Starters by position
Note: Pos = Position; G = Games played; AB = At bats; H = Hits; Avg. = Batting average; HR = Home runs; RBI = Runs batted in

Other batters
Note: G = Games played; AB = At bats; H = Hits; Avg. = Batting average; HR = Home runs; RBI = Runs batted in

Pitching

Starting pitchers
Note: G = Games pitched; IP = Innings pitched; W = Wins; L = Losses; ERA = Earned run average; SO = Strikeouts

Other pitchers
Note: G = Games pitched; IP = Innings pitched; W = Wins; L = Losses; ERA = Earned run average; SO = Strikeouts

Relief pitchers
Note: G = Games pitched; W = Wins; L = Losses; SV = Saves; ERA = Earned run average; SO = Strikeouts

1947 World Series 

AL New York Yankees (4) vs. NL Brooklyn Dodgers (3)

Awards and honors
All-Star Game
Spud Chandler
Joe DiMaggio (starting CF)
Tommy Henrich
Billy Johnson
Charlie Keller
George McQuinn (starting 1B)
Joe Page
Aaron Robinson
Spec Shea

Farm system

LEAGUE CHAMPIONS: Twin Falls

Notes

References
1947 New York Yankees at Baseball Reference
1947 World Series
1947 New York Yankees team page at www.baseball-almanac.com

New York Yankees seasons
New York Yankees
New York Yankees
1940s in the Bronx
American League champion seasons
World Series champion seasons